Statistics and information from the 2015 CCU Men's Soccer team.

Schedule 

|-
!colspan=6 style="background:#008080; color:#FFFFFF;"| Spring season
|-
!colspan=6 style="background:#008080; color:#FFFFFF;"| Preseason
|-

|-
!colspan=6 style="background:#008080; color:#FFFFFF;"| Regular season
|-

|-
!colspan=6 style="background:#008080; color:#FFFFFF;"| Big South Tournament
|-

|-
!colspan=6 style="background:#008080; color:#FFFFFF;"| NCAA Tournament
|-

|-
!colspan=6 style="background:#008080; color:#FFFFFF;"| NCAA Tournament — College Cup
|-

|-

The match between Coastal Carolina and NC State was cancelled due to flooding and severe weather associated with the October 2015 North American storm complex.

References 

Coastal Carolina
2015
Coastal Carolina Chanticleers, Soccer
Coastal Carolina Chanticleers